The Governor of Duhok is the elected head of the Province of Duhok, Iraq .The post was established by President Ahmed Hassan al-Bakr in 1969.

References 

Governorates of Iraq
Governors of Duhok Governorate
Duhok